Hajji Abdollah Bazar (also Romanized as Ḩājjī ʿAbdollah Bāzār; also known as Ḩājīabdollah) is a village in Pir Sohrab Rural District, in the Central District of Chabahar County, Sistan and Baluchestan Province, Iran. At the 2006 census, its population was 174, in 42 families.

References 

Populated places in Chabahar County